Duqm Refinery is an oil refinery under construction at the port town of Duqm in central-eastern Oman, expected to have a 230,000 barrels per day (bpd capacity). It is owned and operated by Duqm Refinery and Petrochemical Industries Company (DRPIC), a joint venture between OQ, a subsidiary of the Government of Oman, and Kuwait Petroleum International, a subsidiary of Kuwait Petroleum Corporation.

As of November 2022, Kuwait Petroleum International announced that the project was 95% complete, and that Duqm Refinery is expected to commence commercial operations by the end of 2023.

References 

Oil refineries in Oman
2023 establishments in Oman